The Yulin–Tieshangang railway (Simplified Chinese: 玉铁铁路) is a single-track electrified railway in China.

History
Construction began in September 2010. Tracklaying began on 20 September 2012. It began operation on 6 May 2015.

On 1 April 2016, a passenger service was introduced between Yulin railway station and Bobai railway station.

References

Railway lines in China
Railway lines opened in 2015